Bikaneri bhujia, often simply called bhujia, is a popular crispy snack prepared by using moth bean flour and gram flour and spices, originating from Bikaner, a city in the western state of Rajasthan in India.  It is light yellow in colour. Bhujia has become not just a characteristic product of Bikaner, but also a generic name.

Bikaneri bhujia is a cottage industry in Bikaner, Rajasthan, and provides employment to around 2.5 million people in villages of the region, especially women, and recently it has faced competition with multinational companies like Pepsico as well as Indian snack companies, which have used the name bhujia. After struggling with numerous copycats over the years, in September 2010, the Indian Patent Office confirmed the Geographical Indications rights and a patent was issued for the brand name Bikaneri bhujia to local manufacturers of Bikaner.

History
In 1877, during the reign of Maharaja Shri Dungar Singh, the first batch of bhujia was produced in the princely state of Bikaner.

Preparation

A dough of moth, garbanzo bean, gram flour and  spices including powdered cellulose, salt, red chilli, black pepper, cardamom, cloves, etc. is made into the snack by pressing it through a sieve and deep frying in vegetable oil. In large parts of India, particularly Rajasthan, Gujarat, Maharashtra, Bihar and West Bengal, it is a standard accompaniment to any meal.

Geographical Indication protection
In October 2008, Bikaneri bhujia was granted Geographical Indication protection. Getting the GI tag will ensure that none other than those registered as authorized users (or at most those residing inside the geographic territory) are allowed to use the popular product name, an assurance of distinctiveness in a land of thousand cultures.

See also
 Rajasthani cuisine
 Sev
 Mysore pak
 Dharwad pedha

References

External links
Bikaneri Bhujia Recipe at Tarla Dalal
Pitaara Bikaneri Bhujia
 Bikaneri Bhujia in making
 Bikaneri Bhujia in making

Bikaner
Indian snack foods
Rajasthani cuisine
Deep fried foods
Geographical indications in Rajasthan